Glew may refer to:

 Glew (character), a fictional character in Lloyd Alexander's children's series The Chronicles of Prydain
 Glew, Buenos Aires, a city in the Buenos Aires province, Argentina
 Glew, Lesser Poland Voivodeship (south Poland)
 Great Lakes Engineering Works, a shipbuilding company with a shipyard in River Rouge, Michigan that operated between 1902 and 1960
 OpenGL Extension Wrangler Library (GLEW), a cross-platform C/C++ library that helps in querying and loading OpenGL extensions